The Office of Fine Arts (M/FA) is a division of the U.S. Department of State reporting to the Under Secretary of State for Management. The mission of the office is to administer appropriate settings for dialogue between U.S. officials and their international guests, to illustrate the continuity of American diplomacy through relevant objects, and to celebrate American cultural heritage through the acquisition, preservation and display of works of art with people around the world.

The office operates the Diplomatic Reception Rooms collection in the Department of State's headquarters, the Harry S Truman Building, as well as the collections at the President's Guest House, Blair House, covering two of the agency's nine heritage asset collections. The office also is tasked with the furnishment of the offices of the Secretary of State and other senior leadership. For over 50 years the office has been assisted by the Fine Arts Committee which held its first meeting on March 22, 1961. , the office is headed by the Director of the Diplomatic Reception Rooms, Marcee Craighill.

History
The work of the office began in 1961, being first tasked with the Americana Project: to remodel and redecorate the 42 Diplomatic Reception Rooms. The Americana Project was headed by the former Assistant Chief of Protocol, Clement Conger, under Secretary of State Christian Herter during the Kennedy administration. Conger had years earlier recommended space for official government entertainment be made in the expansion to the DOS headquarters and Congress had approved this. However, Congress did not appropriate funds for furnishings and interior decoration. Since it began, the office's only use of tax money has been for the salaries and expenses of a small staff.

Diplomatic Reception Rooms

Located on the top two floors of the U.S. Department of State, the 42 reception rooms are used by the President, Vice President, and Secretary of State to officially entertain heads of state, heads of government, foreign ministers, as well as other distinguished foreign and American guests. Here, the Office of Fine Arts maintains a collection of 5,000 objects estimated to be worth $125 million. Objects in the collection reflect American art and architecture from the time of the nation's founding and its formative years, 1750-1825. Approximately 100,000 visitors tour the rooms each year, with public tours being held three times a day. All of the items in the collection have been acquired through donations or purchases funded through gifts from private citizens, foundations, and corporations.

The work of the office regarding the Diplomatic Reception Rooms is supported by an outside 501(c)(3) public charity, the Fund for the Endowment of the Diplomatic Reception Rooms at the U.S. Department of State.

Office of Fine Arts staff take care to curate the rooms with items that are evocative of the values held by the emerging American nation as diplomats and American leadership use the rooms to convey the nation's continued dedication to those values. Additionally the environment may positively inspire civil service and foreign service staff as Secretary Shultz put forward: "And [US Government staff] feel now 'I'm here as part of the history of what's going on and maybe if we do things right they'll hang our picture up here someday and 200 years from now somebody will point to it."

Blair House

The President's Guest House, commonly known as Blair House, is a complex of four formerly separate buildings: Blair House, Lee House, Peter Parker House, and 704 Jackson Place. It is composed of 115 rooms and 30 bathrooms. The President's Guest House is primarily used to host visiting dignitaries and other guests of the president and has been called "the world's most exclusive hotel". It is larger than the White House and closed to the public. The Buildings are owned by the General Services Administration and are managed by the Chief of Protocol of the United States in cooperation with the Diplomatic Security Service, the Bureau of Administration and the Office of Fine Arts.

The financing of the preservation of historic furnishings and art found in the Guest House is supported by an outside 501(c)(3) organization, the Blair House Restoration Fund.

State Offices

In addition to the management of the two heritage assets, the office is responsible for furnishing and maintaining the offices and reception rooms of the Secretary, the two Deputy Secretaries, and the Under Secretary for Political Affairs. Before Fine Arts furnished senior leadership offices, offices were noticeably sparse as Secretary Kissinger describes: "When I was Secretary, the Secretary's office hadn't been rebuilt yet. It was described by somebody as like the boardroom of a medium-seized Midwestern bank. So I frequently took visitors upstairs [to the Diplomatic Reception Rooms] and showed them a more artistic and historic side of America."

Staff
The director of the office retains the title the Director of the Diplomatic Reception Rooms. To date, there have been 3 such directors:

Internships
The Office of Fine Arts at the U.S. Department of State offers internship opportunities in the spring, summer and fall of each year. These opportunities are unpaid, experience-oriented internships in historic artifact research and curation, fundraising, and cultural heritage management. Interns must be (1) a U.S. citizen (2) able to obtain and maintain a security clearance (3) enrolled as a degree-seeking student in an accredited college or university and (4) enrolled as a full- or part-time graduate student in fine or decorative arts. Sessions are 10 weeks of 40 hours each week; students are required to serve a minimum of 24 hours each week for 8 weeks.

See also
 Art in Embassies Program
 Register of Culturally Significant Property
 United States Diplomacy Center
 Ralph J. Bunche Library

References

External links
 
 Director's page at state.gov
 State Careers from Art Studies or Art History
 Fund for the Endowment of the Diplomatic Reception Rooms
 Blair House Restoration Fund
 

1961 establishments in the United States
United States Department of State agencies
Government agencies established in 1961
Arts organizations established in 1961
Museum organizations
Historic preservation organizations in the United States